Public-Private Partnership Authority is an autonomous government agency responsible for the management and support for Public-Private Partnership in Bangladesh and is located in Dhaka, Bangladesh. It is under the Prime Minister's Office, and serves as Bangladesh's PPP unit. Public-Private Partnership are worth US$3.5 billion every year in Bangladesh with the government planning to 12 billion dollar. In 2017 the government of Bangladesh declared a 10-year freeze on taxes for Public-Private Partnership.

History
Public-Private Partnership Authority was established in August 2010. It was part of the Bangladesh Government's Vision 2021 was placed under the Prime Minister's Office.

References

Government agencies of Bangladesh
2010 establishments in Bangladesh
Public–private partnership
Organisations based in Dhaka
Regulators of Bangladesh
Public–private partnership units